Titus Flavius Rufus, son of Titus, of the (voting) tribe Pupinia, was a Roman Centurion in several legions. During his military career, he was promoted from miles in urban cohorts in Rome (Urban cohors XII) to centurio in four different legions: Legio XIV Gemina, Legio XI Claudia, Legio II Augusta and Legio VII Gemina. Additionally, he was ordinatus architectus, tesserarius of a centuria in the 4th Praetorian Cohort, beneficiarius to the Praetorian Praefect, cornicularius to the Praefectus Annonae.

After demobilization, he settled as veteranus in a rural area, in a villa rustica, located at approximately 16 miles (~25 km) from Apulum, an important city of the province Dacia. He lived there with his family until the age of 60 years when he died. His wife, Iulia Maxima, together with the children Flavia Venusta, Maximus and Rufinus, erected his tombstone which was found in the cemetery of modern Răhău village (Sebeș), Alba County, Romania.

His tombstone contains engraved the following text:

The English translation of this text is:

The tombstone of his wife, Iulia Maxima, was found too, nearby.

Another tombstone exists in Ravenna, Italy, erected by his sister Ulpia and Aelia Secundina. This tombstone contains engraved the following text:

The English translation of this text is:

References

Ancient Roman soldiers
Roman Dacia